Unciella is a genus of moths of the family Noctuidae.

Species
 Unciella flagrantis (Smith, 1893)
 Unciella primula (Barnes & McDunnough, 1918)

Noctuidae